Markéta Irglová (born 28 February 1988) is a Czech-Icelandic singer-songwriter, musician and actress, who starred in the film Once, which earned her a number of major awards, including the Academy Award for Best Original Song for "Falling Slowly", with co-writer and co-star Glen Hansard.

Early life
Irglová began taking piano lessons at age 7 and began playing the guitar at age 8.

Career
Irglová is a member of the band The Swell Season with Glen Hansard. The band released its eponymous album on Overcoat Recordings in 2006. In 2007, Irglová co-starred in the indie film Once. Irglová co-wrote many of the songs for the film including "Falling Slowly", which received an Academy Award for Best Original Song. The film won the World Cinema Audience Award for a dramatic film at the 2007 Sundance Film Festival. Irglová appeared on the 2007 I'm Not There soundtrack with the Swell Season's version of Bob Dylan's "You Ain't Goin' Nowhere".

While accepting the Academy Award she and Hansard were played off before she could begin her acceptance speech. Later in the evening comedian Jon Stewart stopped the show to bring her back on stage to complete her speech. She ended it by wishing "fair play to those who dare to dream."

The 2012 Broadway stage adaption of Once (musical) won eight Tony awards and the Grammy Award for Best Musical Theater Album.

In 2022, Irglová was announced as one of the participants in Söngvakeppnin 2022, the Icelandic national final for the Eurovision Song Contest 2022, where she competed with the song "Mögulegt" / "Possible".

In March 2022, Irglová, as part of The Swell Season, embarked on a six-city US tour.

In 2023, Irglová was announced as one of the 5 participants in Eurovision Song CZ 2023, the Czech Republic's national final for the Eurovision Song Contest 2023. She came in 4th place with 1,009 points.

Personal life
   
Irglová met Glen Hansard in 2001 when she was 13 years old. Her parents organized a music festival in the Czech Republic and booked The Frames. Hansard played a large part not only in her development as an artist and songwriter but also in launching her career. Although they met years earlier, her romantic relationship with Hansard began during the making of the film Once and ended in 2009. 

In 2012, Irglová moved to Reykjavík, Iceland where she met Icelandic music producer Sturla Míó Þórisson (Sturla Mio Thorisson) while recording her first solo album, Anar. They later married and now have three children together. Irglová speaks fluent Icelandic and is a dual citizen of the Czech Republic and Iceland.

Discography

With The Swell Season (2006-2009)
The Swell Season (2006)
Once (Soundtrack) (2007)
Strict Joy (2009)

Solo

Anar (2011) 

Irglova's first full-length solo album was titled Anar.

MUNA (2014) 

Irglova's second album was named Muna, meaning “to remember” in Icelandic. Written over the course of a year, and recorded in six months with producer/engineer Sturla Mio Thorisson, it features guests Rob Bochnik (The Frames), Iranian daf player and vocalist Aida Shahghasemi, and Marketa’s sister Zuzi on backing vocals.

LILA (2022) 

Lila is the third of Irglova's albums and was released after a 8 year long hiatus, during which Irglova married, had three children, and built a studio.

Films
Once (2007)
The Swell Season (2011)
Home Is Here (2016)

Television
Live from the Artists Den: The Swell Season (Season 1, Episode 8, 28 Feb. 2008) 
The Simpsons episode "In the Name of the Grandfather" (2009)

Awards and nominations

Awards
Academy Award 2008 Achievement in Music Written for a Motion Picture (Original Song) – "Falling Slowly" from Once
Critics' Choice Award 2008 Best Original Song – "Falling Slowly" from Once
Los Angeles Film Critics Association Award 2008 Best Original Score – for Once

Nominations
Grammy Award 2008 (50th Annual Grammy Awards) Best Song Written for Motion Picture, Television or Other Visual Media – "Falling Slowly" from Once
Grammy Award 2008 (50th Annual Grammy Awards) Best Compilation Soundtrack Album for Motion Picture, Television or Other Visual Media – Once

Footnotes

External links

 
 
 Spotify
 Bandcamp

1988 births
21st-century Czech actresses
21st-century Czech women singers
21st-century Icelandic actresses
21st-century Icelandic women singers
Best Original Song Academy Award-winning songwriters
Czech emigrants to Iceland
Czech film actresses
Czech folk singers
Czech rock musicians
Czech singer-songwriters
Drama Desk Award winners
Icelandic film actresses
Icelandic folk singers
Icelandic rock singers
Icelandic singer-songwriters
Laurence Olivier Award winners
Living people
Naturalised citizens of Iceland
People from Valašské Meziříčí
The Swell Season members